The badminton tournament at the South American Games (a.k.a. ODESUR Games; Spanish: Juegos Sudamericanos; Portuguese: Jogos Sul-Americanos), formerly the Southern Cross Games (Spanish: Juegos Cruz del Sur) are a part of regional multi-sport event held between nations from South America, organized by the South American Sports Organization (Organización Deportiva Sudamericana, ODESUR). There were six badminton events at the 2010 South American Games held over 19–24 March in Centro de Convenciones Plaza Mayor, Medellín, Colombia.

Medal summary

Medal table

Medalists

References 

 
2010 South American Games
South American Games
2010
South American Games